The Minnesota Ballet is a ballet company and school located in Duluth, Minnesota.  Founded in 1965 by Donna Harkins and Jan Gibson as the Duluth Civic Ballet, the company has since expanded into a touring company with seventeen professional artists.  From 1992–2007 the Artistic Executive Director of the Minnesota Ballet was Allen Fields, who retired to become Artistic Director Emirtus.  Fields acquired rights to works by master choreographers like Agnes de Mille, Antony Tudor, and George Balanchine.  He was succeeded by Robert Gardner. In 2019, Minnesota Ballet welcomed a new Artistic Director, Karl von Rabenau, to lead the company. The Minnesota Ballet is entering its 54th season in 2019/20.

History 

Before the Minnesota Ballet existed, Donna Harkin was a ballet teacher with a studio in Duluth. In spring 1965 she choreographed and produced the first all-ballet performance featuring area amateur dancers. The show proved so popular that Northlanders wanted to encourage the young dancers. In December 1965, twenty ballet supporters in the Duluth area formed a board of directors, with Jan Gibson as the first president, establishing the Duluth Civic Ballet with the intention of providing instruction in ballet and using the area's students to form an amateur performing company. The first budget was $1,000.

The Minnesota Ballet expanded into an internationally touring company in 1995 with a performance in San Salvador, El Salvador. Since then the Ballet regularly performs their Nutcracker production in Thunder Bay, Ontario. The Minnesota Ballet also brings its productions to other cities in Minnesota and the surrounding region.

School of the Minnesota Ballet 
Classes range from Pre-Ballet through Ballet VII and pre-professional training; pointe, jazz, modern and tap are also offered. Additionally, the School offers creative movement classes to accommodate those with special needs.  The School offers annual opportunities for students to audition and perform in The Nutcracker with the professional company.  The ballet company has a community outreach program designed to introduce the world of ballet to children throughout the region.

Company
Karl von Rabenau: The Artistic Executive Director of the Minnesota Ballet

A Duluth native, Karl von Rabenau is delighted to return home to Minnesota, where he began his ballet career. Karl started training in the School of the Duluth Ballet, now Minnesota Ballet. He continued his training at Minnesota Dance Theatre, the San Francisco Ballet School, and the Boston Ballet School, where he was asked to join Boston Ballet II and, shortly thereafter, to apprentice with the Boston Ballet company. Karl joined the Omaha Ballet in 1987. In 1988, he accepted the invitation of renowned Balanchine ballerina Patricia Wilde to join the Pittsburgh Ballet Theatre under her direction and with whom he toured to the famed National Theater & Concert Hall in Taipei, Taiwan. Karl danced his final 10 seasons as a soloist with the Milwaukee Ballet, most of those years under the direction of Michael Pink. His wide repertoire included soloist and principal roles in dance masterworks by such ballet luminaries as Alvin Ailey, George Balanchine, Jean-Paul Comelin, John Cranko, Agnes de Mille, Lisa de Ribere, Choo San Goh, José Limón, Eugene Loring, David Parsons, Marius Petipa, and Bruce Wells.

Jennifer Miller: Ballet Master, School of the Minnesota Ballet

Ms. Miller joins the artistic staff of the Minnesota Ballet as Ballet Master after completing nearly 30 years with the Milwaukee Ballet. Ms. Miller danced for the Milwaukee Ballet Company, rising through the ranks to the level of Principal Artist. She has had the privilege of dancing a wide range of featured roles in such ballets as Swan Lake, The Nutcracker, Romeo and Juliet, Hunchback of Notre Dame, Scheherazade, Giselle, Coppélia, Midsummer Night's Dream, Sleeping Beauty; and works by Trey McIntyre, Choo San Goh, David Parsons, George Balanchine, Gerald Arpino, Peter Anastos, Antony Tudor, Lila York, Margo Sappington, Alvin Ailey, Bruce Wells, and Michael Pink. In the summer of 2005, Ms. Miller was invited to dance for the inaugural season of the Trey McIntyre Project, performing in Vail International Dance Festival and Jacob's Pillow Dance Festival.

Lila Ann Coates White: Artistic Associate/Principal Teacher

A native of Kansas City, Missouri, Lila danced six seasons with the Minnesota Ballet before retiring from performing in 1993 to turn to teaching and choreographing. In the 2018–19 season she celebrated her 25th anniversary as Principal Teacher of the School of the Minnesota Ballet. Lila has choreographed works on the school, including a Tribute to the School, set to Alexander Glazunov's Scènes de Ballet for thirty-six students in the Ballet's 50th Anniversary Gala Performance, a stately work that the Duluth News Tribune pronounced “charmingly choreographed.” She has also set classical excerpts on upper-level students, such as the exotic “Kingdom of the Shades,” from Marius Petipa's La Bayadère

Sandra Ehle: Wardrobe designer

An accomplished seamstress, in 2009 Sandra designed more than 100 costumes for the Minnesota Ballet's “Manhattan” Nutcracker. She also travels with The Nutcracker, fitting auditioned students into the costumes. For the Minnesota Ballet she has designed for George Balanchine's Apollo, Who Cares? and Tarantella; Salvatore Aiello's Clowns and Others; Allen Fields’ Rough Cut Swing; Robert Gardner's Dracula, Firebird, and A Midsummer Night's Dream. Most recently she designed for Robert Gardner's Swan Lake in 2018 and Allen Fields’ reimagined Coppélia in 2019. She has worked on two Walt Disney movies; Iron Will and Good Son, and has also worked on Baltimore Opera's productions of Die Fledermaus and Beauty and the Beast. Sandra has traveled to Florida to work with Colleen Smith at Ballet Palm Beach and has also designed for the Saint Augustine Ballet and Rogelio Corrales’ and Lydia Oquendo's St. Lucie Ballet. Sandra lists her most daunting task as the renovating and cleaning of more than 250 costumes after the great storm in summer 2016. The roof of the costume room collapsed, burying costumes under a pile of bricks and soot—costumes that were needed in the 2016–17 season

Cheryl Podtburg: Stage Manager/Projects Coordinator

Cheryl has been keeping predictable backstage chaos to a minimum at the Minnesota Ballet since 2004. Fittingly, Cheryl often creates masks and props for some of the Ballet's characters that create the most choreographed chaos onstage, such as the masks of the mice in The Nutcracker, the masks for the Monsters in Firebird, and Puck's tree for A Midsummer Night's Dream. Before coming to the Minnesota Ballet, Cheryl has managed chaos for a University of Minnesota Duluth production touring to Sicily, as well as various productions in Missouri. Cheryl holds technical theater degrees from Cottey College in Missouri and UMD.

Choreographers 
George Balanchine is a leading contemporary choreographer, is responsible for the choreography in the show "Who Cares?”, a show in the Minnesota Ballet repertoire. George Balanchine was born in St.Petersburg, Russia in 1904. At the young age of 29, he came to the United States, where he co-founded the School of American Ballet in 1934 with an American arts patron, Lincoln Kirstein. On October 11, 1948, The New York City Ballet was founded, and Balanchine became the principal choreographer and ballet master from 1948 until his death in 1983. Balanchine revolutionized classical ballet, by Americanizing his Russian influences. The two styles blended together and created an upbeat dance.

Antony Tudor, originally named William John Cook, was born in London, England on April 4, 1908.  Antony Tudor changed his name after becoming Dame Marie Rambert's general assistant. In 1939 he moved from London to New York City to help Lucia Chase and Agnes de Mille establish the Ballet Theatre (the American Ballet Theatre). He was resident choreographer of American Ballet Theater for ten years. Tudor choreographed with emotion of the whole body, not just with facial expressions. He also created works that were attentive to detail.

Penelope Freeh is a guest choreographer at the Minnesota ballet. Freeh has been a member of the James Sewell Ballet in Minneapolis for fifteen years. In 1998 Freeh received a Minnesota State Arts Board Fellowship and also won a McKnight Fellowship for Dancers in 2003 she received a Jerome Foundation Travel Grant.

Repertoire 
The company's repertoire includes performances from 1965 to the present, including:
 Sleeping Beauty
 Suite Italienne
 One Night
 Three Virgins and a Devil
 Apollo
 Cinderella
 The Nutcracker
 Coppélia
 Dracula
 A Midsummer Night's Dream
 Carnival of the Animals
 The Firebird
 Giselle Act II
 Swan Lake
 Rite of Spring
 Clowns and Others

2018–19 Company dancers 
 Emma Stratton
 Naomi Doty
 Brennan Benson
 Branson Bice
 Charles Clark
 Sam Neale
 Brigid Duffin
 Sarah Gresik
 Brianna Crockett
 Daniel Westfield
 Tyler Piwowarczyk 
 Eric Pagnano
 Sarah White
 Rachel Fuchs- Senior Apprentice
 Payton Kline- Senior Apprentice
 Erin Haebig- Apprentice

References 

 
 

Ballet companies in the United States
Dance schools in the United States
Ballet schools in the United States
Duluth, Minnesota
Tourist attractions in Duluth, Minnesota
Education in Duluth, Minnesota
Performing groups established in 1965
1965 establishments in Minnesota
Dance in Minnesota